Adlai E. Stevenson High School can refer to:
Adlai E. Stevenson High School (Lincolnshire, Illinois)
Adlai E. Stevenson High School (Livonia, Michigan)
Adlai E. Stevenson High School (New York City)
Adlai E. Stevenson High School (Sterling Heights, Michigan)